Vladislav Klyushin (Владислав Клюшин) is a Russian businessman and founder and CEO of M-13, a Russian company that offers media monitoring and cybersecurity services. In March 2021, he was arrested upon his arrival in Switzerland on a warrant from the United States Department of Justice charging him with insider trading using confidential data stolen from US companies. Facing extradition to the US, Klyushin's lawyer maintained that the insider trading charge was fabricated as a “pretext” to get him to the US, where he will be pressed for information on the Russian government's "Fancy Bear" operation that sought to influence the 2016 United States presidential election. He was extradited to the US on December 19, 2021.

Klyushin was convicted by a federal jury on charges of conspiracy, wire fraud and securities fraud on February 14, 2023.

See also 

 Ilya Sachkov
 Russian interference in the 2016 United States elections

References 

Russian media executives
Living people
People associated with Russian interference in the 2016 United States elections
Prisoners and detainees of the United States
Year of birth missing (living people)